Chaa-Khol (Çaa Çaa-Xöl) is a rural locality (a selo) and the administrative center of Chaa-Kholsky District of Tuva, Russia. Population:

References

Notes

Sources

Rural localities in Tuva